Keddy Lesporis (born 27 December 1988) is a St Lucian cricketer from a fishing town called Laboire. and Top-order batsman who plays for the Windward Islands cricket team. He has played for the Sagicor High Performance Centre, St Lucia, and the St Lucia Zouks. Lesporis bats right handed and bowls with a right-arm off spin. Keddy sells merchandise. Every sale he will donate 0.25 cents to help "young men and women from Saint Lucia access the tools, books and training that will help them develop the skills and mind frame to remain ‘Kl at the Crease’ of life." He is quoted as saying "The game of cricket is a perfect metaphor for life. It’s about relationships and teamwork. It’s about being alert, grasping opportunities and knocking badly bowled balls across boundaries. It is about fighting to stand in the face of the unexpected yorker."

References

External links
 

Windward Islands cricketers
1988 births
Living people
Saint Lucian cricketers
Saint Lucia Kings cricketers